Gloria Ida Joseph (1927/1928 – August 6, 2019) was a Crucian-American academic, writer, educator, and activist. She was a self-identified radical Black feminist lesbian writer who synthesized art and activism in her work. Joseph's scholarship centered race, gender, sexuality, and class. She is known for her pioneering work on Black feminism and her activism on issues concerning Black women across the diaspora, including in the Caribbean and South Africa.

Early life and education 
Born Gloria Ida Joseph to Daniel Joseph and Ida David Joseph, they emigrated from Saint Croix to New York City, where Joseph was raised. She was a strong student and also played basketball and field hockey in school. She was the great-niece of philanthropist and racketeer Casper Holstein.

Joseph attended New York University and received her bachelor of science degree in Health, Physical Education & Recreation. Later she received her master's degree in Psychological Services at City College of New York and then worked as a guidance counselor in New York City. Joseph went on to receive her doctoral degree in educational psychology at Cornell University in 1967.

Career 
Joseph worked at Hampshire College as a professor in the School of Social Sciences, where she co-founded the school's the Black studies department in 1969. Joseph also worked for COSEP, a committee where she helped recruit and retain Black and Latino students to the school. During her career she was a prolific writer and engaged the topics of feminism, race, sexuality, and activism. Joseph also founded Sisterhood in Support of Sisters in South Africa, an advocacy group for women in Soweto.

After her retirement  from Hampshire College in the 1980s, she moved back to St. Croix with her life partner Audre Lorde, and continued to write and lecture at various universities as a professor emeritus for another two decades. While there, the couple founded the Che Lumumba School for Truth and the Women's Coalition of St. Croix in 1981, which focused on eradicating local gender-based violence. Joseph also founded the Doc Loc Apiary for local honey production.

After Lorde's 1992 death Joseph published The Wind Is Spirit: The Life, Love and Legacy of Audre Lorde (2016), "a compilation of essays, photos, and recollections by a diverse group of contributors ruminating on how Lorde impacted their life, work, and activism." She and Lorde discussed the project extensively before Lorde's death. Joseph used Kickstarter to help fund the writing and publication. The anthology-biography received a 2017 Lambda Literary Award and the Association for Women in Psychology's 2017 Distinguished Publication Award.

Personal life 
Joseph was a lesbian. She was a life partner of prolific Black feminist writer Audre Lorde. They lived on Joseph's native island home of Saint Croix from 1981 until Lorde's death from cancer in 1992. Joseph later had a long-term relationship with Afro-German activist Helga Emde that lasted over 20 years until Joseph's death.

Death 
Joseph died on August 16, 2019 at age 91 at her home on Saint Croix.

Works 
 Common Differences: Conflicts in Black and White Feminist Perspectives (with J. Lewis). 1986, South End Press 
Hell Under God's Orders: Hurricane Hugo in St. Croix – Disaster and Survival (with H. Rowe and A. Lorde). 1990, Winds of Change Press 
On Time and In Step: Reunion on the Glory Road. 2008, Winds of Change Press 
 The Wind is Spirit: The Life, Love, and Legacy of Audre Lorde. 2016, Villarosa Media

References

External links 
  Video- Gloria Joseph speaking at the First Annual Professor Audre Lorde Memorial Birthday Celebration at Hunter College

1920s births
2019 deaths
Caribbean women writers
21st-century Caribbean people
American women academics
20th-century American women writers
Black feminism
American feminist writers
20th-century American women educators
20th-century American educators
Cornell University alumni
New York University alumni
City College of New York alumni
Hampshire College faculty
LGBT academics
American lesbian writers
Lesbian feminists
People from Saint Croix, U.S. Virgin Islands
Writers from New York City
21st-century American women writers